Paulinus was the master of St. Leonard's Hospital in Yorkshire before he was nominated to be Bishop of Carlisle. He was nominated in 1186, but declined the see.

Citations

References

 

Bishops of Carlisle
12th-century English Roman Catholic bishops